David Cohen (August 1, 1946 – May 14, 2021) was a Canadian immigration lawyer, based in Montreal, Quebec. He was the senior partner at the Cohen Immigration Law firm, and he testified on immigration to the Senate of Canada and Parliament of Canada. He was recognised for his use of the internet to help immigrants move to, and settle in, Canada. He died on May 14, 2021.

Education 
Cohen graduated in 1972 from the McGill University Faculty of Law with a Bachelor of Civil Law degree.

Career 
Cohen began practicing Canadian immigration law after being called to the Bar of Quebec in 1975, and was a member of the Law Society of Ontario. He was a member in good standing of the Canadian Bar Association's Immigration Law Section, the American Immigration Lawyers Association, and the Quebec Immigration Lawyers Association. In 2017, he was named a Life Governor of the Quebec Bar Foundation, which is a charitable organization that seeks to advance the rule of law through research.

In May 2008, he testified before the House of Commons Standing Committee on Citizenship and Immigration and Standing Committee on Finance on the legal impacts of proposed changes to the Immigration and Refugee Protection Act (IRPA). Later that month, he presented similar evidence to the Senate of Canada. Cohen argued against the proposed reforms to IRPA due to concerns they would enable Canada to be discriminatory in its selection of immigrants.

Media 
Cohen received media recognition for his work assisting immigrants. In 2015, David Berger and Cohen spearheaded an effort in conjunction with other members of the Temple Emanu-El-Beth Sholom to reunite Syrian refugees with their families in Montreal. Members of the Temple raised $70,000 to sponsor two Syrian families through Canada's Private Sponsorship of Refugees Program. He was regarded as a pioneer due to his use of technology to provide information on how to move to Canada, as well as to connect immigrants so they can develop social networks and find employment.

He was invited to discuss a variety of different immigration issues with media outlets around the world. For instance, Cohen's analysis on how U.S. politics, such as the outcomes of presidential elections, influences immigration to Canada, has been cited by the likes of the Conference Board of Canada, the New York Times, CNN, the Telegraph, among others.

References 

1946 births
2021 deaths
21st-century Canadian lawyers
Anglophone Quebec people
Lawyers from Montreal
McGill University Faculty of Law alumni